The 2003–04 season was the 68th season in the existence of US Créteil-Lusitanos and the club's fifth consecutive season in the second division of French football. In addition to the domestic league, US Créteil-Lusitanos participated in this season's editions of the Coupe de France and the Coupe de la Ligue.

Players

First-team squad

Transfers

In

Out

Pre-season and friendlies

Competitions

Overall record

Ligue 2

League table

Results summary

Results by round

Matches

Coupe de France

Coupe de la Ligue

References

US Créteil-Lusitanos seasons
Créteil